Mir Aamir Ali Khan Magsi (born 27 December 1960 ) is a Pakistani politician who has been a member of the National Assembly of Pakistan, since August 2018. Previously he was a member of the National Assembly from 2008 to May 2018.

Early life
He was born on 27 December 1960.

Political career

He was elected to the National Assembly of Pakistan as a candidate of Pakistan Peoples Party (PPP) from Constituency NA-206 (Kamber Shahdadkot) in 2008 Pakistani general election. He received 49,524 votes and defeated Nawabzada Sardar Khan Chandio, a candidate of Pakistan Muslim League (Q) (PML-Q).

He was re-elected to the National Assembly as a candidate of PPP from Constituency NA-206 (Kamber Shahdadkot) in 2013 Pakistani general election. He received 87,789 votes and defeated Asgher Shah Rashdi, a candidate of Sindh United Party. In the same election, he ran for the seat of the Provincial Assembly of Sindh as an independent candidate from Constituency PS-40 (Larkana-VI) but was unsuccessful. He received 132 votes and lost the seat to Mir Nadir Ali Khan Magsi.

He was re-elected to the National Assembly as a candidate of PPP from Constituency NA-203 (Qambar Shahdadkot-II) in 2018 Pakistani general election.

References

Living people
Pakistan People's Party politicians
Sindhi people
Pakistani MNAs 2013–2018
People from Sindh
1960 births
Pakistani MNAs 2008–2013
Pakistani MNAs 2018–2023